Jean Madeira, née Jean Browning (born November 14, 1918, in Centralia, Illinois; died on July 10, 1972, in Providence, Rhode Island) was an American contralto, particularly known for her work in late-romantic German repertoire such as the operas of Richard Wagner and Richard Strauss.

When she was a child her family moved to East St. Louis, Illinois, where she attended high school, and she later studied with Florence Kimball at the Juilliard School in New York City. She made her debut in opera in Chatauqua, as Nancy in Martha, by Flotow. In 1955, the singer and actress successfully sang the title role in Carmen with the Vienna State Opera. She sang approximately 300 times at the Metropolitan Opera in forty-one roles, between 1948 and 1971.  Her last appearance there was in Elektra, opposite Birgit Nilsson and Leonie Rysanek.[3] Jean Madeira was a second-cousin of the composer Amy Beth Kirsten.

Abridged discography 

 Bizet: Carmen as Carmen (Filacuridi; Dervaux, 1957) Pathé
 Britten: Peter Grimes (Jon Vickers; 1967) Immortal Performances
 Falla: Three Cornered Hat (Vienna Symphony) Tuxedo Music
 Mozart: Le nozze di Figaro as Marcellina (Siepi, Conner, Valdengo, de los Angeles; Met, Fritz Reiner, 1952) Myto
 Mozart: Requiem in D Minor, K.626 (NBC Symphony, Arturo Toscanini, 1950) RCA Victor
 Pochielli: La Gioconda as La Cieca (Milanov, Warren, Barbieri, Siepi; Met, Cleva, 1953) Gala
 Puccini: Madama Butterfly as Suzuki (Steber, Tucker, Valdengo; Met, Rudolf, 1949) Sony
 Puccini: Manon Lescaut (Kirsten, J.Björling, Valdengo; Met, Antonicelli, 1949) Myto
 Saint-Saëns: Samson et Delilah as Delilah (Del Monaco; Teatro di San Carlo, Molinari-Pradelli, 1959) Hardy Classic
 Strauss: Elektra as Clytemnestra (Borkh, Schech, Uhl, Fischer-Dieskau; Böhm, 1960) DG
 Strauss: Elektra, as Clytemnestra (Nilsson, Rysanek, Nagy, Stewart; Met, Bohm, 1971) Met On Demand
 Verdi: Aida as Amneris (Rysanek, London, Frick, Hopf; Vienna State Opera, Kubelik, 1955) Orfeo
 Verdi: Requiem (Vienna Symphony, Erich Kleiber 1955) Melodram
 Verdi: Un ballo in maschera as Ulrica (Bergonzi, Rysanek, Merrill; Santi, 1962) Living Stage
 Wagner: Das Rheingold as Erda (Flagstad, London; Solti, 1958) Decca
Wagner: Die Walkure as Fricka (Nilsson, Rysanek, Ludwig, Hotter, Frick, Suthaus; La Scala, Karajan, 1958) Myto; IDIS
 Wagner: Der Ring des Nibelungen as Erda, Rossweisse & First Norn (Bayreuth, Knappertsbusch, 1956) Orfeo
 Wagner Parsifal (Svanholm, Varnay, London, Hotter; Met, Stiedry, 1954) Adonis

References 

 [3] Elektra (27 February 1971), Metropolitan Opera Archives
Madeira, Jean (Mezzo-soprano) on the MetOpera Database

External links 
Villecco, Tony. A Voice Like Velvet; Remembering Contralto Jean Madeira. Classical Singer Magazine Oct. 2012.
  (1958).
  (1958).
Jean Madeira fan page on Facebook
Jean Madeira, 53, A Metropolitan Contralto
Jean Madeira's Final Opera Performance (alongside Birgit Nilsson and Leonie Rysanek in Elektra, 27 February 1971)
Francis Madeira Dies At 100

American operatic mezzo-sopranos
1918 births
1972 deaths
Juilliard School alumni
20th-century American women  opera singers